Joft Rud (also Romanized as Joft Rūd and Joft Rood; also known as Jofrūd and Jufrūd) is a village in Khusf Rural District, Central District, Khusf County, South Khorasan Province, Iran. At the 2006 census, its population was 21, in 7 families.

References 

Populated places in Khusf County